Georges B.J. Dreyfus (born 1950 in Switzerland) is an academic in the fields of Tibetology and Buddhology, with a particular interest in Indian Buddhist philosophy. In 1985 he was the first Westerner to receive the Geshe Lharampa degree, the highest available within the Tibetan scholastic tradition.

He currently is Jackson Professor of Religion at Williams College, Massachusetts.

Selected bibliography

 Dreyfus, Georges B.J. (2003) The Sound of Two Hands Clapping: The Education of a Tibetan Buddhist Monk. University of California Press, Berkeley. 
 Dreyfus, Georges B.J (1997) Recognizing Reality: Dharmakīrti's Philosophy and its Tibetan Interpretations. State University of New York Press, Albany.

References

External links 
 Profile at Williams College Department of Religion

Tibetologists
1950 births
Living people
Swiss philologists